The 2018 Open de Guadeloupe was a professional tennis tournament played on hard courts. It was the seventh edition of the tournament which was part of the 2018 ATP Challenger Tour. It took place in Le Gosier, Guadeloupe between 27 March and 1 April 2018.

Singles main-draw entrants

Seeds

 1 Rankings as of 19 March 2018.

Other entrants
The following players received wildcards into the singles main draw:
  Corentin Denolly
  Dušan Lajović
  Gianni Mina
  Stefanos Tsitsipas

The following player received entry into the singles main draw using a protected ranking:
  Santiago Giraldo

The following players received entry into the singles main draw as alternates:
  Lloyd Glasspool
  Kaichi Uchida

The following players received entry from the qualifying draw:
  Sander Gillé
  Tom Jomby
  Laurent Rochette
  Evan Song

Champions

Singles 

  Dušan Lajović def.  Denis Kudla 6–4, 6–0.

Doubles 

  Neal Skupski /  John-Patrick Smith def.  Ruben Bemelmans /  John-Patrick Smith 7–6(7–3), 6–4.

External links
Official Website

2018 ATP Challenger Tour
2018
2018 in French tennis
2018 in Guadeloupean sport